Eläintarha Stadium is a multi-purpose stadium at the Eläintarha park in Helsinki, Finland. It was opened in 1910 as the first stadium in Helsinki. Today it is mostly used by track and field athletes.

History 
Eläintarha Stadium served as the main sports venue of Helsinki until 1938, as the Olympic Stadium was completed. In 1911 Eläintarha hosted the first international of the Finland national football team and in 1925 the first annual Finland-Sweden Athletics International. It was fully renovated in 2005 and 2012 as the stadium was used as a warm-up area for the Athletics World and European Championships.

World Records 
The following World Records were set at the Eläintarha Stadium. On 19 June 1924 Paavo Nurmi first broke the 1,500 meters world record and 45 minutes later he set a new record in the 5,000 meter run.
1,500 meters
3:52.6 –  Paavo Nurmi, 19 June 1924
5 000 meters
14:28.2 –  Paavo Nurmi, 19 June 1924
14:17.0 –  Lauri Lehtinen, 19 June 1932
10 000 meters
30:35.4 –  Ville Ritola, 25 May 1924
110 metres hurdles
14.4 –  Bengt Sjöstedt, 5 September 1931
Javelin throw
76.10 –  Matti Järvinen, 15 June 1933
Decathlon
7,485.61 –  Aleksander Klumberg, 22 September 1922
7,995.19 –  Paavo Yrjölä, 17 July 1927

References 

Sports venues in Helsinki
Multi-purpose stadiums in Finland